Kunt is a Turkish surname. It means strong or durable in ancient Turkish.

Notable people with the surname include:
 Burakcan Kunt, Turkish soccer player
 Josef Kunt, Czech Olympic fencer
 Murat Kunt (born 1945), Swiss scientist

See also
 Kunter, Turkish and German name/surname
 Cunt, vulgarism, generally referring to the female genitalia
 Kunt and the Gang, minor internet singer from Basildon, United Kingdom

Turkish-language surnames